Genre analysis may refer to:

Genre criticism
Genre studies